The Rensselaer Society of Engineers (RSE) is a social fraternity founded in 1866 at Rensselaer Polytechnic Institute in Troy, NY. Originally named The Pi Eta Scientific Society, the organization was incorporated in 1873 in the state of New York. Arriving on campus at about the same time as some of the first fraternities, it has remained one of the oldest "local" organizations in the U.S. RSE is the only independent fraternity at Rensselaer.  They have chosen to remain independent to maintain the freedom to set their own policies and make their own managerial decisions. Contrary to what their name may imply, members major not only in engineering, but also in such disciplines as science, management, architecture, and the arts. Society members are active in not only campus and local activities, but are also in many national organizations.

Society history

The Rensselaer Society of Engineers was founded as the Pantotherian Society or The Pi Eta Scientific Society in 1866. The society was subsequently incorporated under the laws of the state of New York in 1873. Under society's constitution, candidates for membership were nominated by members of the society.  After one's proposal for membership there was a minimum of a one-week waiting period during which their candidacy was considered.  After the prescribed waiting period their membership was decided by a vote of a society.  Initially, any potential member receiving a black ball during the vote was declined membership, the constitution was later amended to permit two black balls before a member was declined.  Upon initiation new members were expected to pay a $3 initiation fee.  In addition to students being eligible for membership in Pi Eta, honorary membership was also extended to any graduate or officer of Rensselaer or any person who had distinguished themselves in their scientific endeavors.  Membership could also be revoked by a two thirds majority vote of the membership.  At its first officer election held on May 24, 1867 the following officers were elected:
President: Pompeyo Sariol of Puerto Principe, Cuba
Recording Secretary: Albert H. Millet of Paris, France
Corresponding Secretary: Palmer H. Baerman of Troy, New York
Treasurer: Max L. Goldstein of New York City

In 1867 the society created a library to collect scientific and engineering publications in addition to original works by members.  Today the library continues to be housed in the society's clubhouse.  A model of diversity, the society counted among its members students from across the United States and Central and South America. By 1880 Pi Eta's membership included two Japanese students and one of five Chinese students enrolled at Rensselaer.

In 1883, the Pi Eta scientific society became the Rensselaer Society Of Engineers. The reason for this was to distinguish themselves from the other fraternities in the region as well as to show their close ties with Rensselaer Polytechnic Institute. Prior to occupying its current location the Rensselaer Society of Engineers have met in several locations in the city of Troy. Prior to the present headquarters location, a house on Burdett Avenue in Troy was used for approximately four-years between 1920 and 1924. The previous locations were used mainly for meeting and study purposes.

In chronological order, these locations were:
Prior to April 1868: Rented rooms belonging to a Dr. Watkins
April 1868 – 1870: Unknown Location
After 1870: Hannibal Green Building, Broadway, Troy NY
Before 1881: 4th Street, Troy, NY
1881 - 1908: 219 River Street, Troy, NY
1908 - 1920: 257 Broadway, Troy, NY (second floor above a bank - three rented rooms)
1920 - 1924: Burdett Ave., Troy, NY
1924 through Present: 1501 Sage Ave, Troy, NY

The Clubhouse

The idea of constructing a clubhouse, potentially with dormitory style living quarters was first formally discussed at the society's 1909 annual meeting.  At that meeting, it was decided to wait until such a time that the institute's students began relocating from downtown Troy to the main campus which is situated on a hill above the city.  Over the ensuing years student living preferences changed as predicted and the institute dormitories and educational buildings on the hill grew.  At the 1912 annual meeting a house committee was charged with evaluating the feasibility of building a clubhouse and ultimately determining its location.  The committee eventually decided on six key points:

That a location as near the campus as possible would be desirable.
Since there were no buildings on the hill in which rooms similar to those occupied by the society could be obtained, that it would be necessary to erect a new house suitable for the society's purpose.
That to make this house strictly a clubhouse would be adding expense to the society without increasing its income; and therefore, to increase the income of the society sufficiently to meet the cost and maintenance of a home, it would be necessary to provide a dormitory in the house.
That while sufficient accommodations might be provided in the house for a commissary, the maintenance of an eating club was not within the province of the society, and must be carried on by the members independently.
That with sufficient dormitory space for twenty to twenty-five students, a house would be entirely practical  financially, provided the active members of the society could raise more than enough money to purchase a building lot.
That while it may not be advisable to proceed with the building at the present time, it would be advisable to purchase the lot immediately—any delay might make it difficult to obtain a suitable location in the vicinity of campus.

With these ideas in mind, in 1912 the house committee obtained purchase options on two lots owned by a development company called Troy Parkway Villa Site.  The first lot could be purchased for $3,500 while the second was $2,500.  The two lots were located on People's Avenue, one block away from the main campus.  With the purchase options in hand the building committee solicited donations to commence the project with the hope that a decision could be made by the 1913 annual meeting.  The solicitations included a conceptual floor plan for each of the clubhouse's three proposed floors.  At the meeting the total amount of funds pledged toward the construction effort amounted to $430.  Fund raising strategies were discussed and implemented however despite these efforts the project would languish for another two years.

On May 12, 1915 it was finally announced that, for $3,750, the Rensselaer Society of Engineers had purchased a one-acre lot in the Troy Parkway Villa Site from the firm of Gilbert Geer, Jr. & Co.  Following the purchase, the society's building fund was left with $14,900.  The lot was situated on the corner of Sage Avenue and Griswold Road, closer to campus and the new quadrangle dormitories than the People's Avenue lots first considered in 1912.  The society intended to erect a clubhouse on the property in the near future.  This was at a time when all the fraternities on campus had begun planning to move into houses constructed close to the rapidly growing institute.  The initial design plans called for a structure "strictly fireproof and modern in every particular" that was expected to cost around $50,000, the equivalent of $1.17 million today.  At the time it was hoped that construction would begin as early as the summer of 1915.  The reality of the fundraising challenge soon became evident and the effort took longer than expected.  It is estimated that there were approximately 350 living alumni in 1915.  The average contribution needed to achieve the committee's $50,000 goal was approximately $43, which if adjusted for inflation would be nearly $990 today.  For comparison, the annual median household income in 1915 was $687, or $16,000 when adjusted for inflation.

As the dream of constructing a purpose built clubhouse for the society was hampered by funding challenges, the population of RSE students on campus continued to grow.  In 1920 the society purchased a house on Burdett Avenue adjacent to Samaritan Hospital to house some of its members.  While the Burdett Avenue house did not fully satisfy the needs of the society, it did make RSE one of the first four fraternities on campus to own their own house.  The fund raising effort to build a house on the vacant property on the corner of Sage and Griswold continued with both the graduate and undergraduate members pressing alumni for both donations and previously unpaid activity fees.  The society even offered to repay loans from alumni from the proceeds of the sale of the Burdett Avenue house once the new clubhouse was completed.  Ultimately a donation from Pittsburgh industrialist and philanthropist John M. Lockhart of $100,000 proved to be sufficient to begin construction in 1923 with famed architect Bertram Grosvenor Goodhue chosen to be architect for the house while the Ernest F. Carlson Company of Springfield Massachusetts was selected as the contractor.

As construction progressed it became evident that additional funds would be necessary.  To support the completion of the clubhouse, Lockhart made a subsequent $100,000 donation.  After being completed the house was formally dedicated on June 12, 1924, with alumni coming back to Troy in force for the occasion.  The formal completion of the house occurred on September 13, 1924 and a formal gala was held the following October.  Attending the celebration was Lockhart who had the honor of being the first to sign the Clubhouse's new guest book followed by the members of the building committee who had worked for nearly a decade to make the clubhouse a reality.

There are multiple specialized rooms in the clubhouse.  There is an archive room, billiards room, and a library.  Originally, members lived in a dormitory located on the third floor of the clubhouse.  The remaining levels of the house were full of study rooms, a lecture hall, a room for the chef, and an infirmary.  Since then multiple rooms have been built on the second and third floors to house the members that decide to live in the clubhouse.

Over the years the mechanical and electrical systems of the house have been gradually modernized. In 2000 the clubhouse roof was replaced for only the second time since its construction. Beginning in the Fall of 2009, renovations were done to the living room with $100,000 spent to fix plaster damaged by water leaks. The windows and doors were also replaced to enhance house security and allow for usage as the old ones were sealed shut. The purpose of the living room is not only for house functions, but is used to host guest speakers throughout the year. The living room is also the venue for the annual Holiday Banquet. Renovations to the clubhouse continued in 2013 as significant restoration work was performed on the building's exterior masonry features. The house's front brick patio was restored and its underlying steel reinforced concrete structure was repaired for the first time since its construction. Additional extensive repairs were conducted to replace damaged and cracked limestone trim stones.

Events and activities
The historic house is an iconic image in the Rensselaer landscape. For this reason, RSE is host to a variety of functions, both fraternal and academic. Listed below are but a few of these functions. 
 Holiday Banquet

Nearly every year since the construction of the clubhouse RSE has also hosted a Holiday Banquet. The banquet has been a long-standing tradition of the society, in which each member invites one or two of their professors to attend. Invitations are also sent out to the RPI Board of Trustees and the current President of the Institute as well. Each year a speaker is asked to present on a topic of their choice.
 Annual Alumni Greek Chowderfest
 Alumni Weekend

In the month of October, RPI hosts an annual Alumni Weekend for all past graduates of the university to come back for a reunion. RSE takes this opportunity to host a reunion of their own. This year (2016), RSE will host its sesquicentennial (150th) anniversary of its founding in 1866.

Philanthropy
The Rensselaer Society of Engineers donates many hours and dollars each year to both local and national charitable organizations. Through Children International, RSE has supported children in Colombia as they struggle to grow up in poverty. RSE also hosts an annual breakfast to raise money for The Children's Miracle Network. This popular event involves the cooking of hundreds of breakfast sandwiches which are sold to students and delivered to various campus faculty and offices.  Since the 1960s RSE has also proudly hosted an annual holiday party for local children through the Troy Boys and Girls Club and other organizations.

RSE Scholarships
The Rensselaer Society of Engineers offers a number of scholarships annually to its members.

The RSE-Rensselaer Academic Scholarship is awarded to a sophomore and is applied by Rensselaer to tuition for both the junior and senior years. It is based on excellence in the classroom.
The RSE-Rensselaer Brotherhood Scholarship is awarded to a junior who has shown exceptional community, school, and fraternity spirit and involvement while maintaining strong academic success. It is applied by Rensselaer to tuition for senior year.
The Becker Scholarship, in memory of Frank W. Becker '83, is awarded to a sophomore who has shown exceptional dedication to RSE brotherhood. It is applied by the RSE Foundation to room and board for the junior year.
The Rudy Bergfield Scholarship was started by a substantial donation for Rudy Bergfield '49. This scholarship is for a member who is involved with athletics, is in good academic standing, who shows dedication to the RSE brotherhood. Rudy Bergfield was the captain of the men's lacrosse team during his years at Rensselaer.

Notable alumni and honorary members

1866-1900
Rev. John Ireland Tucker - Musician, early Rensselaer Trustee, long time rector at the Church of the Holy Cross in Troy, New York, and the first honorary member.
Sandford Fleming - Canadian railway engineer and inventor of worldwide standard time & early honorary member
William Metcalf - 1858 - American steel manufacturer & early honorary member
Albert H. Millet - 1867 - Designed and built the southern railroad in Ecuador, the custom house of Ecuador at Guayaquil, the waterworks of Guayaquil, and many other public works, as well as constructions of all kinds on the Isthmus of Panama.
Leffert L. Buck - 1868 -American civil engineer and Union army veteran responsible for bridge construction projects including the Verrugas Viaduct on the Oroya Railroad in Peru, the steel suspension bridge over the Niagara Gorge the Williamsburg Bridge, one of New York City's most notable landmarks, with Henry Hornbostel. At 1,600 feet it was the longest bridge in the world when completed in 1903 and a key factor in opening Brooklyn up as a working-class neighborhood for Manhattan. The bridge is well known for its vast reach and massive symmetry, and the Pont De Rennes bridge (former Platt Street bridge) that spans the Genesee River in Rochester at the High Falls. A dormitory in the Quadrangle complex at Rensselaer is named after him.
Othniel Foster Nichols - 1868 - Builder of the Manhattan Bridge  
Julio Larrinaga - 1869 - Noted Puerto Rican engineer and erecting engineer of the Arenas Bridge
John Hampden Randolph - 1870 -  Confederate Civil War veteran and son of John Hampden and Emily Randolph, builders of Nottoway Plantation.  Professor of mechanical engineering at Louisiana State University and inventor of Randolph's Pea Vine Hay Rake, a popular machine with contemporary sugar planters.
Henry Rowland - 1870 - US physicist, known for diffraction grating
Henry Grant Morse - 1871 - Founder of The New York Ship Building Corporation
Charles G. Roebling - 1871 - Designed and invented an 80-ton wire rope machine and founded the town of Roebling, New Jersey where the John A. Roebling's Sons company steel mill was built.
John F. Alden - 1872 - Noted bridge designer known for the successful construction of the Driving Park Avenue Bridge in Rochester which others had twice attempted and failed. He also built the bridge over the Columbia River at Paseo, Washington, two large viaducts at Los Angeles, California, the upper suspension bridge at Niagara Falls, several bridges for the Chicago, Milwaukee, and St. Paul Railroad, and other bridges throughout the country. The structural steel work which he did for the World's Columbian Exposition at Chicago in 1893 is also noteworthy.
William Hubert Burr - 1872 - Engineer involved with the Catskill Aqueduct and Isthmian Canal Commission
Lyman E. Cooley - 1874 - Appointed by President Grover Cleveland to the Deep Waterways Commission to negotiate an agreement between the U.S. and Canada regarding the creation of a waterway to allow ocean-going traffic between the Great Lakes and the Atlantic Ocean. Proposed the construction of the Chicago Sanitary and Ship Canal.
John Alexander Low Waddell - 1875 - American civil engineer and prolific bridge designer
Palmer Ricketts - 1875 - Honorary member and 11th president of Rensselaer
Souichiro Matsmoto - 1876 - Japanese student sent to Rensselaer after the Meiji Revolution for an engineering education.  Matsmoto later made significant contributions to civil engineering in Japan and later served as president of the Imperial Railways of Japan.
Kaname Haraguchi - 1878 - Japanese student sent to Rensselaer after the Meiji Revolution for an engineering education.  After returning to Japan he became chief engineer in Tokyo and designed many iron bridges there.
Don Carlos Young - 1879 - Son of Brigham Young, American architect and the Church Architect for the Church of Jesus Christ of Latter-day Saints
Feramorz Little Young – 1879 – Son of Brigham Young and Lucy Decker.  Railroad engineer and Mormon missionary to Mexico.
Wilberforce Beecher Hammnond – 1879 – Inventor of an improved automatic sprinkler head
Robert Rufus Bridgers - 1879 - Railroad engineer and son of Robert Rufus Bridgers Confederate politician during the American Civil War.
Ernesto Joaquin Balbin - 1882 - Chief of the Cuban Lighthouse board and erection supervisor for the Colorados Reef Lighthouse on the Colorados Archipelago
Francis H. Bainbridge - 1884 - Railway engineer and designer of the Ashfork-Bainbridge Steel Dam, the first large steel dam in the world, and one of only three ever built in the United States
John M. Lockhart - 1887 - Son of one of the founders of Standard Oil, Lockhart lived his life as a Pittsburgh financier, steel maker, and benefactor with a passion for anonymity.
Eduardo Justo Chibás - 1888 - Prominent Cuban engineer and father of Eduardo Chibás
Edwin S. Jarrett - 1889 - Founding officer of The Foundation Company, America's premier soils & foundation engineering firm of the early 20th Century.  They designed and constructed the foundations for most of the tallest buildings in Manhattan (Trinity, Woolworth, Whitehall, Singer, Banker's Trust, and Municipal Buildings).
Harry H. Rousseau - 1891 - Civil Engineer and Rear Admiral in the US Navy.  Member of Isthmian Canal Commission

1901-1950
Shortridge Hardesty - Honorary member and designer of the John P. Grace Memorial Bridge in Charleston, SC. First chair of the American Society of Civil Engineers Column Research Council (Structural Stability Research Council since 1976). 1940 Recipient of the Norman Medal, the highest honor granted by the ASCE for a technical paper.
William O. Hotchkiss - Honorary member and tenth president of Rensselaer Polytechnic Institute
Sanford Lockwood Cluett - Honorary member, businessman, and inventor.
Matthew A. Hunter - 1908 - Honorary member, metallurgist and inventor of the Hunter process for producing titanium metal
Lester C. Higbee - 1912 - Brigadier General in the New York State National Guard and Commander to the upstate New York State Guard during WWII
John Inglis – American Football and Baseball player
Henry G. Taylor - 1913 - Rear Admiral US Navy during WWII 
Archibald D. Hunter -  1930 - Commodore in the US Navy
Clayton O. Dohrenwend –  1931 – Former Rensselaer graduate school head and vice president and provost
Albert J.  Fay - 1932 - Rear Admiral in the US Navy
Horace B. Jones - 1932 - Rear Admiral in the US Navy

1951-Present
 John F. Schenck - 1961 - Physician and co-inventor of the first clinically viable high-field MRI scanner at General Electric and member of the Rensselaer Alumni Hall of Fame.
Lombard John Pozzi - 1967 - Renowned architect and preservationist of Rhode Island
Don Nigbor - 1970 - Co-Founder of Benchmark Electronics
Frank Batteas - 1977 - NASA Research Pilot
Lieutenant General L. Scott Rice - 1980 - director of the Air National Guard

Notes

External links
Member Website

1866 establishments in New York (state)
Fraternities and sororities in the United States
Rensselaer Polytechnic Institute
Local fraternities and sororities
Student organizations established in 1866